Rydman is a surname. Notable people with the surname include:

 Arvid Rydman (1884–1953), Finnish gymnast, competed in the 1912 Summer Olympics
 Blaine Rydman (born 1949), Canadian ice hockey player
 Fredrik Rydman (born 1974), Swedish dancer
 Tore Rydman (1914–2003), Swedish curler
 Wille Rydman (born 1986), Finnish politician

Surnames